Achaea orbigera is a species of moth of the family Erebidae. It is found in Papua New Guinea.

The female of this species has a wingspan of 66mm.

References

Achaea (moth)
Moths of Papua New Guinea
Moths described in 1917